Becka Anne Leathers is an American freestyle wrestler from Choctaw, Oklahoma.

Domestic career
In her youth, she was a multi-time national champion, including cadet and junior national champion.

In college, she was a WCWA national champion as a freshman at Oklahoma City University

International career
Leathers was a gold medalist at the 2017 Pan American Championships.  Later that year, she was a bronze medalist at the 2017 World Wrestling Championships in the 55 kg weight class.

Leathers's other wins include the Dave Schultz Memorial, University Nationals, U.S. World Team Trials, Pan American Championships, and the Grand Prix of Spain.

References

American female sport wrestlers
Living people
World Wrestling Championships medalists
1996 births
21st-century American women
Pan American Wrestling Championships medalists